Karen Marie Freeman-Wilson (born October 24, 1960) is an American attorney, former judge, and politician who served as Indiana Attorney General from 2000 to 2001, as well as mayor of Gary, Indiana from 2012 to 2019. She has been President and CEO of the Chicago Urban League since January 2020.

Early life and education
Freeman-Wilson was born and raised in Gary, Indiana. She earned a Bachelor of Arts degree from Harvard University and Juris Doctor from Harvard Law School.

Career
Freeman-Wilson served as judge of the Gary City Court from 1995 to 2000.

Attorney General of Indiana 
In 2000, she was appointed Indiana Attorney General by Governor Frank O'Bannon to serve the remaining eleven months of the term of Jeff Modisett, who resigned to become Deputy CEO and General Counsel to the Democratic National Convention.

As the incumbent, Freeman-Wilson ran for Indiana Attorney General in 2000 but lost to Republican Steve Carter. State auditors later found that the Freeman-Wilson issued more than $700,000 in grants without approval from the Governor and various agencies during her eleven months in office. The Indiana State Board of Accounts discovered this when it filed the annual audit of this office in 2001. The State Board found that Freeman-Wilson issued grants from the $1.39 million payment Indiana received for work on the national tobacco settlement. A $500,000 grant to the Indiana Minority Health Coalition was also issued without approval from the Governor and agencies under his control. Freeman-Wilson acknowledged, "mistakes were made." In an interview with The Indianapolis Star, she said, "I'm not going to criticize Mr. Carter and I don't think he should criticize me." Attorney General Carter responded, "We can only clean up the office from this point forward."

Non-profit work 
After leaving office, Freeman-Wilson went on to become CEO of the nonprofit National Association of Drug Court Professionals. While there she helped get a trial of Prometa, a treatment for methamphetamine addiction, launched in the Gary drug court. In July 2007, Hythiam Inc., the company licensing the Prometa protocol, named Freeman-Wilson to its board of directors. Other executive posts held by Freeman-Wilson include Executive Director of the National Drug Court Institute and director of the Indiana Civil Rights Commission.

Freeman-Wilson served as legal counsel to the Gary Urban Enterprise Association from 1995 to 2006.

Mayor of Gary
In April 2011, Rudy Clay announced he was ending his re-election campaign due to prostate cancer, endorsing Karen Freeman-Wilson as his successor. Rudy Clay asked his supporters to vote for Freeman-Wilson. In May 2011, Freeman-Wilson won the Democratic mayoral primary for the city of Gary. She had previously run in both 2003 and 2007, losing to Scott L. King and Rudy Clay respectively. Given the political nature of Gary she was considered a heavy favorite in the general election. She won the election with a landslide 87 percent of the vote. She became the city's first female mayor. Freeman-Wilson and her "New Day" Transition Team developed a Blueprint for Gary, promising to improve public safety, economic development, and the city's appearance and image. She has refused to allow a museum in the childhood home of Michael Jackson.

Freeman-Wilson appeared during her tenure as mayor in a December 21, 2016 episode of Undercover Boss, in which she was disguised as a long-haired woman from Nashville, Tennessee with a Southern accent. The episode highlighted wage and infrastructure challenges related to Gary's tight budget and allowed the mayor to evaluate ways to improve working conditions. Unlike other episodes, in which bosses tend to provide gifts with the organization's money, she relied on private donations, a personal donation, and strategic budgeting to provide gifts and investments.

Freeman-Wilson was denied a third term in the May 2019 mayoral primary, when she lost to Lake County Assessor, Jerome Prince. Since there were no other contenders on the November general election ballot, Prince officially succeeded her in office on January 1, 2020, two days after he was sworn in as the city's 21st mayor on December 30, 2019.

References

External links

1960 births
Women mayors of places in Indiana
Living people
Mayors of Gary, Indiana
Indiana Attorneys General
Indiana Democrats
Women in Indiana politics
Harvard Law School alumni
African-American women lawyers
American women lawyers
African-American lawyers
African-American people in Indiana politics
Participants in American reality television series
Harvard College alumni
African-American mayors in Indiana
21st-century African-American people
21st-century African-American women
20th-century African-American people
20th-century African-American women
African-American women mayors